Alfred Gandier was a Presbyterian minister in Ontario, Canada from 1889 to 1908, son of Joseph Gandier and Helen Eastwood. He was principal of Knox College at the University of Toronto (1909-1925) before becoming the first principal of Emmanuel College, Victoria University (1928–1932).

References

Canadian Presbyterian ministers
1861 births
1932 deaths
20th-century Presbyterian ministers
19th-century Presbyterian ministers
People from Northumberland County, Ontario
Academic staff of the University of Toronto